The 2011 Jordan Rally was the fourth round of the 2011 World Rally Championship season. The rally was also be the second round of the Super 2000.

The rally concluded with the closest finish in the history of the World Rally Championship. Heading into the final  Power Stage, Jari-Matti Latvala held a lead of 0.5 seconds over Sébastien Ogier, but Ogier overhauled his rival by just 0.2 seconds after winning the stage by 0.04 seconds over Latvala's Ford teammate Mikko Hirvonen, and crucially, 0.7 seconds over Latvala. Sébastien Loeb finished third ahead of Hirvonen. Bernardo Sousa won the Super 2000 class with a tenth place overall finish.

Results

Event standings

Special stages

Power Stage
The "Power stage" was a live, televised  stage at the end of the rally, held near the Dead Sea Centre.

References

External links
 Results at eWRC.com

Jordan
Rally